This is a list of presidents of South Africa by age, including state presidents (1961 to 1994) and presidents (since 1994).

This table lists presidents by age at assuming office from youngest to oldest

List of presidents by longevity

South African heads of state's ages

References

South Africa, Presidents
South African Presidents by age